False River Regional Airport  is a public use airport located two nautical miles (3.7 km) northwest of the central business district of New Roads, a city in Pointe Coupee Parish, Louisiana, United States. The airport is owned by New Roads and Pointe Coupee Parish.  According to the FAA's National Plan of Integrated Airport Systems for 2009–2013, it was classified as a general aviation airport.

Facilities and aircraft 
It has one runway designated 18/36 with an asphalt surface measuring 5,003 by 75 feet (1,525 x 23 m).

The airport has a terminal building, three corporate hangars, six T-hangars, and two privately owned hangars. An additional seven T-hangars are under construction. The services and facilities include: flight training, airport management, aircraft parking (ramp/tie down), flight planning, computerized weather, a pilots lounge, restrooms, ground transportation, and rental cars.

For the 12-month period ending January 28, 2009, the airport had 50,125 aircraft operations, an average of 137 per day: 99.8% general aviation and 0.2% military. At that time there were 26 aircraft based at this airport: 81% single-engine, 8% multi-engine, 8% helicopter and 4% glider.

References

External links 
 False River Regional Airport, official site
 Aerial photo as of 21 February 1998 from USGS The National Map
 
 

Airports in Louisiana
Buildings and structures in Pointe Coupee Parish, Louisiana